One Time may refer to:

 "One Time" (Cherish song), 2017
 "One Time" (Justin Bieber song), 2009
 "One Time" (Migos song), 2015
 "One Time" (Nav and Don Toliver song), 2022
 "One Time", a song by King Crimson from their album Thrak, also appearing in their album/DVD Eyes Wide Open
 "Rocket Sneaker/One x Time", a song by Japanese artist Ai Otsuka
 1Time, a South African airline
 One timer, an ice hockey shot
 One time, one times, one-time, etc., an American (commonly found in hip hop music) slang term for police officers